Robert Louis Stevenson School is a private school situated in Apia, Samoa. It was first established in 1987 and was the first private School to operate in the country. Robert Louis Stevenson School is known for achieving high academic results in Samoa's National Examinations (SSC and SSLC Exams). Many of the alumni from Robert Louis Stevenson School are leaders and business owners within Samoa's top professions. The support that the school receives from the alumni is on the rise. With the disruption of the Pandemic over the past two years, parents, teachers and students have come together to ensure that Robert Louis Stevenson remains the top educational institution for secondary students in Samoa. The school's reputation, as well as the sprawling campus facilities in Tafa'igata is a testament to the support and belief in the administration. 

There are roughly 50 staff members and over 600 students. Teachers hail from across the Pacific including New Zealand and Australia. It is a competitive place of employment with teachers across the nation competing to work at the school.

The school will celebrate its 35th anniversary in 2022.

Campuses
Originally in Siusega, the primary school campus is now in the village of Lotopa with an air-conditioned computer lab, 14 classrooms, and a library building. All classes are taught in English, and Samoan classes are compulsory.

The secondary school was originally located in Mulinu'u before moving to Tafaigata. The campus consists of an air-conditioned library building and computer lab. There are 8 classrooms and one multi-purpose hall.

References

Educational institutions established in 1987
Schools in Samoa
Buildings and structures in Apia
1987 establishments in Samoa